Of This Men Shall Know Nothing (German: Von diesem wissen Männer nichts) is oil on canvas painting by a German painter, sculptor, graphic artist, and poet Max Ernst. The painting was completed in 1923 in Paris, France. It is created in a Surrealism style by use of symbolic painting genre during First French period. The painting measures 81 by 64 centimeters and is now housed at Tate Liverpool.

Description 
The painting shares several features with Silberer's diagram: its landscape setting and low horizon; the gradation of the sky from light at the bottom to dark at the top; and the inclusion of the Sun and the Moon. Ernst replaced the cube of Primal Matter with a pile of entrails. Elsewhere Ernst also employed alchemical motifs, such as in this painting of the sexual conjunction of Sun and Moon.

References 

1923 paintings
Paintings by Max Ernst
Collection of the Tate galleries
Moon in art